New Southgate railway station is on the boundary of the London Borough of Barnet and the London Borough of Enfield in north London, in Travelcard Zone 4.

The station, and all trains serving it, have been operated by Great Northern since 14 September 2014.

Location
The station is administered by the London Borough of Enfield, although the boundary with the London Borough of Barnet runs through the station, rather than along one side. The station has exits into both boroughs.

History

Building of the station

The station opened by order of the Middlesex Justices (see Middlesex Guildhall), on 7 August 1850 as Colney Hatch & Southgate station or Colney Hatch station by the Great Northern Railway (GNR). The Justices insisted on trains stopping daily for the benefit of the Second Middlesex County Asylum opened that year at Colney Hatch, which became Friern Hospital and closed in 1993. The original booking office, which sat on a bridge across the railway lines, burned down in 1976 and was replaced by a portakabin.

Service patterns
The station was built next to the asylum, with a siding which connected by a tramway to the stores depot in the grounds. There was one train hourly to Hatfield in the north and to Hornsey and King's Cross in the south in 1860, when the journey to King's Cross took 18 minutes. Trains, as before, ran hourly in 1975.

Renamings
The name of the station has changed five times: to Southgate and Colney Hatch on 1 February 1855; to New Southgate and Colney Hatch on 1 October 1876; to New Southgate for Colney Hatch on 1 March 1883; to New Southgate and Friern Barnet on 1 May 1923; and finally to New Southgate on 18 March 1971,

Operators
The GNR came under the London and North Eastern Railway (LNER) after "Grouping" in 1923, before British Railways took over upon nationalisation in 1948. WAGN (an acronym of West Anglia, Great Northern) operated the service from 1997 to 2006.

Ticketing
In autumn 2008, a self-service ticket machine widening payment methods to accept cash and debit/credit cards, was installed at the eastern street-level entrance. An older PERTIS machine remains in situ.

Services
Off-peak, all services at New Southgate are operated by Great Northern using  EMUs.

The typical off-peak service in trains per hour is:
 2 tph to 
 2 tph to 

During the peak hours, the service is increased to 4 tph in each direction.

The station is also served by a small number of Thameslink operated services to and from  via the Thameslink Core. These services are operated using  EMUs.

Connections
London Buses routes 221, 232, 382 and night route N91 serve the station.

References

External links

Railway stations in the London Borough of Barnet
Railway stations in the London Borough of Enfield
DfT Category E stations
Railway stations in Great Britain opened in 1850
Former Great Northern Railway stations
Railway stations served by Govia Thameslink Railway